Cokeburg is a borough in Washington County, Pennsylvania, United States and part of the Pittsburgh metropolitan area since 1950. Founded in 1902, the population was 626 at the 2020 census.

Geography
Cokeburg is located at  (40.100120, -80.063637).

Cokeburg is drained by Pigeon Creek.

The borough is crossed by Pennsylvania Route 917.

Demographics

At the 2000 census there were 705 people, 308 households, and 206 families living in the borough. The population density was 1,931.0 people per square mile (735.7/km2). There were 339 housing units at an average density of 928.5 per square mile (353.8/km2).  The racial makeup of the borough was 98.87% White, 0.14% Asian, and 0.99% from two or more races.
Of the 308 households 26.9% had children under the age of 18 living with them, 50.6% were married couples living together, 13.3% had a female householder with no husband present, and 33.1% were non-families. 31.2% of households were one person and 19.2% were one person aged 65 or older. The average household size was 2.29 and the average family size was 2.85.

The age distribution was 21.0% under the age of 18, 6.8% from 18 to 24, 27.0% from 25 to 44, 23.5% from 45 to 64, and 21.7% 65 or older. The median age was 42 years. For every 100 females, there were 85.0 males. For every 100 females age 18 and over, there were 81.4 males.

The median household income was $30,179 and the median family income  was $39,028. Males had a median income of $32,404 versus $19,514 for females. The per capita income for the borough was $15,754. About 6.9% of families and 9.9% of the population were below the poverty line, including 14.9% of those under age 18 and 13.2% of those age 65 or over.

In popular culture
The series final episode of the TV series Quantum Leap, starring Scott Bakula and airing on May 4, 1993, on NBC, was set in Cokeburg. The site was chosen because it was the childhood home of the show's creator, Donald P. Bellisario.

Notable person
 Donald P. Bellisario (born August 8, 1935): television producer and screenwriter

References

External links
 

Boroughs in Washington County, Pennsylvania
Populated places established in 1902
Pittsburgh metropolitan area
1902 establishments in Pennsylvania